Jenaain Babil Sport Club, is an Iraqi football team based in Babil, that plays in Iraq Division Three.

Players

Current squad

Current technical staff

See also 
 2020–21 Iraq FA Cup

References

External links
 Jenaain Babil SC on Goalzz.com

2020 establishments in Iraq
Association football clubs established in 2020
Football clubs in Babil